Elena Bondar (born 6 November 1958) is a retired Romanian rower who competed in the eights. She won bronze medals at the 1980 Olympics and 1981 World Championships.

References

External links 
 
 
 

1958 births
Living people
Romanian female rowers
Olympic rowers of Romania
Rowers at the 1980 Summer Olympics
Olympic bronze medalists for Romania
Olympic medalists in rowing
Medalists at the 1980 Summer Olympics
World Rowing Championships medalists for Romania